Xiaoting is a district of the city of Yichang, Hubei, People's Republic of China. In the A Dictionary of Current Chinese, Xiaoting is used as an example of usage of the rarely used character .

Administrative divisions
Three subdistricts:
Gulaobei Subdistrict, Huya Subdistrict, Yunchi Subdistrict

See also
 Battle of Xiaoting

References

County-level divisions of Hubei
Geography of Yichang